Sampi is an archaic letter of the Greek alphabet.

Sampi may also refer to:
 Everlyn Sampi, Australian actress
 Ashley Sampi, Australian-rules footballer

See also
 Sápmi, historic region of Arctic Scandinavia